The 1990 Paisley South by-election was a parliamentary by-election held on 29 November 1990 for the House of Commons constituency of Paisley South, in the town of Paisley, Scotland.

It was caused by the death of the previous Labour Member of Parliament, Norman Buchan.

As in the by-election in the neighbouring seat of Paisley North held on the same day, the SNP saw a healthy increase in their share of the vote, but not enough to win, and the Labour Party retained the seat, with Gordon McMaster emerging as the victor.

The by-election was the first parliamentary election to take place under the premiership of John Major, who had succeeded Margaret Thatcher as Prime Minister just two days earlier. Although the change of party leader sparked an almost instant upswing in Conservative support (which had been declining for the previous 18 months largely due to the poll tax) and ultimately saw them win the 1992 general election with their highest number of votes on record, the Tories failed to take advantage of this by-election; polling at a mere 13.4% and failing to alter the political climate in a traditional Labour stronghold.

Results

See also
 Paisley South (UK Parliament constituency)
 1997 Paisley South by-election
 1990 Paisley North by-election
 Elections in Scotland
 Lists of United Kingdom by-elections

References

1990 in Scotland
1990s elections in Scotland
Politics of Paisley, Renfrewshire
1990 elections in the United Kingdom
By-elections to the Parliament of the United Kingdom in Scottish constituencies